The Madagascar clawless gecko (Ebenavia inunguis) is a small nocturnal species. It is found on the Indian Ocean islands of Madagascar, Mauritius, the Comores and Pemba island. By day they hide under the bark of big rainforest trees or in leaf litter. Despite their name, females of the species do have claws.

References

External links
 A photo of Ebenavia inunguis
 A photo of Ebenavia inunguis from Andasibe, Madagascar

Reptiles of the Indian Ocean
Ebenavia
Reptiles described in 1878